is a 2016 Japanese tokusatsu web series based on the 1974-75 series Kamen Rider Amazon.

Main characters

Haruka Mizusawa
 is the third-type Amazon created by Reika Mizusawa, a hybrid created from Reika fusing a sample of her DNA into Amazon Cells. Haruka is kept in seclusion for two years while under deluded into thinking he is human before failing to administer the serum designed to keep his Amazon Cells under control. This resulted in him transforming into his berserk  form before receiving the  belt from Nanaha to gain some self-control while transforming into . Eventually learning the truth, Haruka vows to use his power to protect those who deserve it regardless if they are human or Amazon. Five years later, he uses the  belt that Reika sent to him to enhance himself into .

During the events of Last Judgement, two years after the events of the second season, Haruka is hunted by 4C as he and Jin are the last surviving Amazons. He ends up stumbling on a scheme by Tachibana and Einosuke Mido to use Amazons as livestock. Mortally wounded from his final battle with Jin, Haruka is forced to eat a dying Muku to save him and attempted suicide before an illusion of Mizuki convinces him to keep living as a protector.

Jin Takayama
 is a former cell biologist at the Nozama Pharmacy who felt that Amazons are his responsibility following the Experiments' escape due to his role in their creation. This ultimately placed him at odds with Haruka as he took the full dosage of the anti-Amazon Cell gas during the Tlaloc Incident, causing his cellular makeup to mutate as he continued hunting down the Amazons. Upon learning Nanaha was pregnant with their son Chihiro, Jin resolved to kill him and was partially blinded by Haruka between the events of the first and second seasons. While Jin assumed Nanaha was killed by their son, he learns she evolved into an Amazon and killed her before helping Haruka finish Chihiro off.

During the events of Last Judgement, Jin was captured by 4C and hand over to Einosuke Mido who used his blood to create the Domesticated Amazons while modeling himself into Amazon Neo Alpha. Jin later escapes with Haichi's help, getting his revenge on Mido before he being fatally wounded by Haruka when he attempted to kill the Domesticated Amazons.

Mizuki Mizusawa
 is Reika's daughter and Haruka's half-sister, Mizuki attempting to reason with Haruka to return home with her before accepting that he cannot even if he wanted. Five years later, having joined to fight Haruka should he turn on humanity, she serves as a member of Aoyama team at 4C before transferring to Kurosaki team after her teammates were slaughtered by the Sea Urchin Amazon.

Nanaha Izumi
 is Jin's partner and lover, leaving him upon learning she is pregnant with their son Chihiro out of fear of Jin killing them. She ends up being slaughtered by Chihiro when he first entered his Origin form, only to resurrect into the angelic  as a result of her pregnancy. Mamoru intended to use her create more New-Type Amazons, only for her to end up being killed for good by Jin and the Exterminators.

Chihiro
 is the first of the New-Type Amazons, the son of Jin and Nanaha who is a hybrid like Haruka. He would ultimately be revealed to be the carrier of the  that mutated from Jin's DNA, giving him regenerative abilities while his Amazon Origin form is an all-consuming monster with multiple arms with one such limb initially used by Mamoru to create the New-Type Amazons. He uses the Neo Amazons Driver belt to transform into . Chihiro joins C4's Kurosaki squad after falling in love with Iyu Hoshino, seeing her as a means to restore her humanity. But Chihiro's Amazon instincts overwhelm him upon Iyu's death, leading to him being killed by Haruka and Jin with his body completely destroyed to prevent further outbreak.

Iyu Hoshino
As a Sigma-type Amazon, outfitted with a bionic eye, Iyu is essentially an emotionless killing machine unable to register pain and needed to survive on protein while assigned work with Team Kurosaki to detect and exterminate Amazons. When Chihiro joined Team Kurosaki, he gradually humanized Iyu which convinced Tachibana to deem her a failure and has her killed off.

Hiroki Nagase
After 4C recaptures Chihiro, Hiroki joins the Nozama Peston Service after one friend became a New-type Amazon that crippled the other while gradually learning the various complications relating to the Amazon. Sometime after Chihiro's death, Hiroki returns to high school

Recurring characters

Nozama Peston Service
The  is a group created by Nozama Pharmacy to hunt down and kill the Experiment Amazons. To cover their modus operandi, they disguise themselves as a pest extermination group to the public. Following the Tlaloc Incident, Nozama Peston Service reforms after a three-week long disbandment and becomes independent as Nozama Pharmacy suffers severe financial problems.

Makoto Shido
 is the leader of the Exterminators who is a former Special Forces member of the Tokyo Metropolitan Police Department, joining the group to pay for his son's treatment.

Mamoru
He is the most naive member of the group and joined it because he liked hamburgers and the other members, only to leave the group with Haruka after he accidentally gained a taste for human flesh and attacked Misaki. Five years later, he became the rogue Amazons' leader and sought to increase his race's numbers by creating the New-Type Amazons by first using a surviving arm of Chihiro's Amazon Origin form and then Nanaha as her blood was directly infected by her son. He ultimately dies in an attempt to protect Nanaha from his former teammates.

Ryusuke Otaki
While Ryusuke attempted to conceal his identity, he ran out of the serum that kept his Amazon instincts in check and killed Jun before being bifurcated by Amazon Omega.

Nozomi Takai
 is the only female member in the Exterminators who mastered martial arts, joining the group to earn money for the children's home she grew up in.

Kazuya Misaki
 is a former con man who joined the Exterminators to pay his debts, especially to a scary syndicate. He is in charge of distracting the general public during the group's Amazon exterminations. His left forearm was later eaten by Mamoru, replacing it with an artificial arm.

Kota Fukuda
, nicknamed "Fuku" by the group, is responsible for logistical support. He once worked under Shido at the Special Forces of the police, following him into Exterminators to pay the care cost for his mother who suffers from dementia. This played in Fukuda joining 4C's Kurosaki squad, putting him at odds with his former allies until he was forced to kill his mother when she ended up becoming a New-Type Amazon.

Jun Maehara
 is an expert hacker of the NPS who was killed by the Dragonfly Amazon, only to be revived by Yugo Tachibana as the first Sigma-Type Amazon and uses the Amazons Driver belt to transform into . But process altered Jun's mind and turned him into an evil sociopath, later killed by Mamoru after receiving major damage from fighting both Haruka and Jin at once.

Nozama Pharmacy
 is a pharmaceutical company that has been conducting extensive research to develop a microscopic artificial life form called , implied by Jin to be for military applications. When the Experimental Amazons they created escaped two years prior due to Tenjou orchestrating an explosion in the testing facility, the company quietly attempts to resolve the matter by enlisting the Peston Service to track down any active Amazon and exterminate. Following the Tlaloc Incident, Nozama Pharmacy suffered a massive layoffs from financing 4C along with reparations for victims or surviving families of Amazon attacks. Notably, Nozama written in the Latin alphabet is "Amazon" backwards.

Takaaki Tenjo
 is the corrupt chairman of Nozama Pharmacy whose obsession with Amazon Cells renders him apathic to the lives of others or even his own, revealed to have masterminded the Experimental Amazons' release into the city to observe the lifeforms' full potential regardless of who they kill. He later appears during the events of season two observe Chihiro's battle against 4C.

Reika Mizusawa
 is the chief officer of the Nozama Pharmacy's Special R/D department and overseer of the Amazon Project. She is mother to both Mizuki and Haruka, the latter by Reika synthesizing her own DNA into Amazon Cells. She later developed Operation Tlaloc as a means to eliminate two thirds of the Amazon population. During the events of season two, sending Kanou to keep tabs on Tachibana and secretly funding the Nozama Peston Service, Reika intended to harvest Chihiro's genetic sample before realizing he is too great a risk to be kept alive.

Shogo Kanou
 is Reika's secretary who Tachibana manipulated into giving him an Amazons Driver. Five years later, serving the man's right hand, Kanou is sent by Reika to spy on Tachibana as a Nozama Pharmacy representative before he was later killed by Chihiro in his Origin Form.

Sawaguchi
 is a researcher of the Special Research and Development Headquarters who engages in Operation Tlaloc at Reika's behest.

4C
, often abbreviated to 4C, is the organization formed as a collaboration between the Nozama Pharmacy and the government after the downfall of the company due to the Amazon scandal.

Yugo Tachibana
 is the Chief of 4C, previously chief officer of the Nozama Pharmacy's international marketing branch, who is adamant of destroying what he cannot control. He facilitated the creation of the Sigma-Type Amazons, using the corpse of Jun Maehara and the Amazons Driver to perfect his process. After the Nozama Pharmacy collapsed, Tachibana joined 4C and rose up the ranks while converting Iyu Hoshino into a Sigma Amazon. He later be heavily crippled by Chihiro when he goes berserk while in his Amazon Origin form, ordering Iyu's death for regaining her humanity and deciding to commence the Amazon Livestock Project to rectify Japan's food crisis with the Domesticated Amazons.
 

Takeshi Kurosaki
 is an Amazon extermination squad leader, a cynical man who has a justified yet immense hatred towards Amazons with trust issues towards like Fukuda as he believes that any sympathy towards Amazons is a weakness yet ironically showed little concern for Iyu. In the movie epilogue Last Judgement, Kurosaki sides with Nozama to remove Tachibana from command upon learning of the man growing new Amazons for his own agenda.

Ichiro Fudamori
 is a government official who serves as Team Kurosaki's analyser.

Hajime Hoshino
 is a university professor specializing in cell biology who is Iyu's father and Jin's mentor, approached by the latter when Nanaha is pregnant. Helping Nanaha go into hiding with Haruka, who became his assistant, Hajime is confronted by Jin and ends up being infected with a blood sample from Chihiro. This resulted with Hajime mutating into the New-Type Amazon  on his birthday, slaughtering his family before being killed by Haruka who honored the man's wish to die to maintain whatever humanity he had left.

Takumi Yamashita

Kenta Kitamura
 is a member of Team X who was amputated his right leg after being attacked by the Baboon Amazon.

Amazons
The  are monsters created by Nozama Pharmacy-based from a virus-size artificial lifeforms called . Due to the Amazon Cells need for human-based proteins to maintain or enhance their strength, an Amazon is usually driven by instinct to hunt humans or cannibalize the other Amazons in extreme cases.

Experiment Amazons
The Experiment Amazons are outfitted with Amazons Registers to supply them with a limited supply of drug-based depressant to quell the Amazon Cells, allowing them to blend into human society and feed like regular humans. However, once the serum runs out, an Amazon would usually be consumed by its instinct to devour humans. Also the Amazons Register double as tracking devices, due to transformed Amazon is beyond the serum's potency and would need to be killed. But Experiment Amazons that suffered traumatic experience are able to subvert their man-eating instincts with most are incapable of directly hurting humans unprovoked. While Haruka attempted to lead the remaining thousand to a new place to exist in peace following Operation Tlaloc, the Experiment Amazons eventually died out due to Jin hunting them down despite their attempt to fight back by creating the New-Type Amazons to fight for them.

:
:
She would later be killed by Amazon Omega bifurcating her.
: An army of 181 Amazons that live with Kukizono, all having been in a dormant state until they sensed their queen was attacked by Amazon Omega and the Nozama Peston Service. The Soldier Ants were all eventually killed when exposed to an early form of the gas later used in Operation Tlaloc.
: Amazons that use their antennae as tendrils, their larval stage able to trap their victim in silk to suck out their body fluids. The first Butterfly Amazon seen is a bus driver that partially awakened kidnapping passengers to feed a fully awakened Butterfly Amazon larva, which later molted into a complete Imago form. Both Butterfly Amazons were killed by Amazon Omega.
: Amazons whose behavior pattern involved placing people in high places, leaving them only unconscious before feeding. Haruka fails to dispatch one Shrike Amazon during his first official mission with the Nozama Peston Service.
: A young man whose Amazon nature awakened when he found the victim of a murderer. 
: An Amazon that assumed the identity of a chef who killed and fed humans to fellow unawakened Amazons to keep themselves from being consumed by their instincts. However, the Nozama Peston group learn of their activities with the Crab Amazon killed while all but one of his clients killed off by the perfected gas.
She was originally one of the Crab Amazon's clients before the Nozama Peston Service Extermination Team raids the restaurant. While subjected to the Tlaloc gas, she managed to survive and escape into the sewers where other Amazons are hiding. But after encountering Haruka a second time, she ends up awakening into her Amazon form and attempts to eat Mizuki with a reluctant Amazon Omega forced to kill her.

New-Type Amazons
During the events of the second season, Mamoru used the  contained in one of the severed arms of Chihiro to rebuild the Amazons' numbers by place it in the water used by Aroma Ozone water dispensers, mutating those infected from drinking it into New-Type Amazons. When the limb was removed, Mamoru resorts to using Nanaha Izumi's altered DNA to continue. Like the Experiment Amazons, though having a higher variety of forms and unable to absorb whatever they are wearing at time, the New-Types would end up becoming man-eating monsters once the infection takes hold and compels them to feed. Unlike the Experiment Amazons that turn into puddles of black slime upon death, New-Type Amazons petrify.

: An Amazon that mutated from a male police officer, while the second mutated from a male demolition worker.
: An Amazon that mutated from a bride.
: An Amazon that mutated from a female wedding attendant, while the second mutated from a male demolition worker.
: An Amazon that mutated from a female wedding attendant, while the second mutated from a male demolition worker.
: The first Snake Amazon mutated from a female wedding attendant, while the second mutated from a sniper who accidentally ingested Chihiro's blood.
: An Amazon that mutated from a male office worker.
: An Amazon that mutated from a male doctor.
: An Amazon that mutated from a nurse.
: An Amazon that mutated from a young man named .

Spin-off exclusive characters

Einosuke Mido
He uses the  armlet to transform into , and the Neo Amazons Driver belt is used to produce weapons and perform finishers.

Domesticated Amazons
Amazons created by Einosuke Mido using Jin's cells as part of 4C's alternative solution to Japan's food crisis, raised by Mido to be given to people for consumption.

: An Amazon called , who befriended Haruka and Mizuki during their stay in the Kiriko Seien.
: 
: 
: An Amazon called .
: An Amazon called .
: An Amazon called .

Notes

Amazons
Kamen Rider Amazons
Fictional mutants